is a life simulation and rhythm video game developed by Compile Heart and Tamsoft and published by Idea Factory in Japan and NIS America in North America, Australia and Europe exclusively for the Sony PlayStation Vita. The game is a spin-off of the Hyperdimension Neptunia game series. The game was released in Japan on June 20, 2013, in North America on June 3, 2014, in Australia on June 5, 2014, and in Europe on June 6, 2014.

Story
All of a sudden an idol game appears and MOB48 (a reference to the real-world idol group AKB48) are taking shares away from the four goddesses (Console Patron Units, or simply CPUs). Players have to get shares back by earning stage points during live performances. Each show, the number of fans and haters will change depending on the show. Players can choose costumes for the idols and change the camera angle. During live events, the CPUs can transform which also transforms their singing voice.

Characters

The four goddesses, Neptune, Noire, Blanc and Vert are all set to return in this game. They are in their Victory costumes according to the official website.

Their sisters, Nepgear, Uni, Ram and Rom are also set to appear in the game. Players can use them in the concerts as background dancers in unlimited live mode only.

IF and Compa are also usable as background dancers as well.

Reception

Hyperdimension Neptunia: Producing Perfection received mixed reviews. It received an aggregated score of 53.14% on GameRankings based on 21 reviews and 54/100 on Metacritic based on 20 reviews.

References

External links
 
 

2013 video games
Compile Heart games
Hyperdimension Neptunia games
Japanese idol video games
Music video games
Nippon Ichi Software games
PlayStation Vita games
PlayStation Vita-only games
Video game spin-offs
Video games developed in Japan
Video games featuring female protagonists